Girl o' My Dreams (a.k.a. Love Race) is a 1934 American college comedy film directed by Ray McCarey and featuring Sterling Holloway and Lon Chaney Jr.

Plot summary
Larry Haines (Edward J. Nugent) is the school's track champion. The “Big Man on Campus”, his success goes straight to his head. His friends, Spec Early (Sterling Holloway), Bobby Barnes (Arthur Lake), and his girlfriend Gwen (Mary Carlisle), get fed up with him, and his swollen head.

They decide that he needs to get his big head deflated; so, they rig the “Joe Senior” college contest, so Larry comes in second. They make sure Don Cooper (Lon Chaney Jr.) wins; and, he begins to go out with Gwen, much to the dismay of his own steady girlfriend Mary (Gigi Parrish).

It soon becomes clear that Mary's not the only thing Don's forgotten about. It looks like both Don and Larry are in such a muddle they, and their school, are going to lose the track meet. Once again, it's up to the girls to sort out the mess, and spur them on to victory.

Cast
 Mary Carlisle as Gwen
 Sterling Holloway as Spec Early
 Edward J. Nugent as Larry Haines
 Arthur Lake as Bobby Barnes
 Lon Chaney Jr. as Don Cooper
 Tom Dugan as Joe Smiley
 Gigi Parrish as Mary
 Jeanie Roberts as Kittens
 Betty Mae Crane of The Crane Sisters as 'Nip and Tuck' Twin
 Beverly Crane of The Crane Sisters as 'Nip and Tuck' Twin
 Lee Shumway as Coach
 Ted Dahl as Orchestra Leader

External links
 
 

1934 films
1934 comedy-drama films
Monogram Pictures films
American comedy-drama films
American black-and-white films
Films scored by Edward Ward (composer)
Films directed by Ray McCarey
1930s English-language films
1930s American films